Kairat Lama Sharif (born January 1, 1962) is the Ambassador of Kazakhstan to Saudi Arabia.

References

Ambassadors of Kazakhstan to Saudi Arabia
Living people
Kazakhstani diplomats
1962 births
Place of birth missing (living people)